Vestone is a comune in the province of Brescia, in Lombardy, Italy. It is situated on the river Chiese. Neighboring communes are Barghe, Bione, Casto, Lavenone, Mura, Pertica Alta, Pertica Bassa, Preseglie, Provaglio Val Sabbia and Treviso Bresciano. Its population is 4,340.

References

Cities and towns in Lombardy